The Myongji University Korean Language Institute is an institute in Seoul, South Korea which offers Korean as a foreign language courses. It was established in 2008 and has been providing language education for South Korean government scholarship students. Currently there are 500 students from over 19 different countries.

Overview 
The academic year consists of 4 semesters (Spring, Summer, Fall, Winter) offered in 5 levels. There are classes 5 days a week (Monday to Friday), 4 hours a day.

Events and activities 

 The orientation provides general introduction of the institute and life in South Korea.
 Once a semester, a variety of events are offered for experiencing Korean culture and Korean history.
 Certification Ceremony for Outstanding Academic Performance and Attendance.

External links 
 Myongji University

See also
Language Education Institute

References

Myongji University
Korean-language education